Peter Banner was an English-born architect and builder who designed the Park Street Church in Boston, Massachusetts, and other buildings in New England in the early 19th century.

Life and career
Banner trained in London, and moved to America. In 1798, he moved from New York to New Haven, designing and building several buildings for Yale College. He began working in the Boston area around 1805, when Ebenezer Craft (born 1779) commissioned Banner to build his house in Roxbury. Around 1806 to 1808, Banner supervised the building of India Wharf. In Boston he also designed the Park Street Church (1809), located next to the Boston Common.

As well as being familiar with architecture through books, Banner was a skilled carpenter-joiner and mason, as well as a contractor, even worked on his own buildings. At various times he worked with Solomon Willard and others.

Selected designs
 1799 – President's house, Yale College, New Haven, Connecticut.
 1800 – Berkeley Hall, Yale College, New Haven, Connecticut.
 1804 – Lyceum, Yale College, New Haven, Connecticut.
 1804 – Church, Brookline, Massachusetts.
 1805 – Crafts house, Roxbury, Massachusetts.
 1809 – Park Street Church, Boston, Massachusetts.
 1811 – Parish houses for Old South Church, Boston, Massachusetts.
 1816 – First Unitarian Church, Burlington, Vermont
 1818 – Antiquarian Hall, American Antiquarian Society, Worcester, Massachusetts.

References
Notes

External links

 Image of Berkeley Hall, Yale College.
 Image of Lyceum, Yale College.

Architects from Boston
Architects from New Haven, Connecticut
English emigrants to the United States
English architects